Saint-Jean-Baptiste was a former municipality in La Mitis Regional County Municipality in the Bas-Saint-Laurent region of Quebec.

It ceased to exist on June 13, 2001 when it merged with Mont-Joli, Quebec.

References

Former municipalities in Quebec